The Municipality of Magdalena de Kino is a municipality ('county') in Sonora state in Northwestern Mexico. 

The Municipal seat is the town of Magdalena de Kino. It is a selected Pueblo Mágico for its scenic historical qualities.

The tomb of Spanish colonial missionary Eusebio Kino is located here.

Geography 
It is located in the northern part of the State of Sonora, 50 miles (80 kilometers) south of the border with the United States; its extreme coordinates are 30° 26'- 31° 06' North latitude and 110° 44'- 111° 18' West longitude, its altitude fluctuates between a minimum of 1640 feet above sea level (500 meters asl) and a maximum of 6890 feet asl (2100 meters asl). The municipality has an area of 563.8 square miles (1,460.23 square kilometers) that represent 3% of the total area of Sonora.

It is bordered to the North by the municipality of Nogales, to the South by the municipality of Santa Ana (Sonora), to the East by the municipality of Ímuris and the municipality of Cucurpe, and to the West by the municipalities of Tubutama and Sáric.

Localities 

 La Misión

Government

Municipal presidents

References

External links

Municipalities of Sonora